Sherman is an unincorporated community in Grant County, New Mexico, United States.

The George O. Perrault House and the San Juan Teacherage, which are listed on the National Register of Historic Places, are located in Sherman.

Notes

Unincorporated communities in Grant County, New Mexico
Unincorporated communities in New Mexico